Shawn Szydlowski (born August 5, 1990) is an American professional ice hockey Winger who is currently playing with the Orlando Solar Bears of the ECHL.

Playing career
Prior to turning professional, Szydlowski played four seasons (2007–11) in the Ontario Hockey League with the Erie Otters On April 8, 2011, the Buffalo Sabres of the National Hockey League (NHL) signed Szydlowski as an undrafted free agent to a three-year entry-level contract.

In the final year of his entry-level deal with the Sabres, Szydlowski was assigned to ECHL club, the Fort Wayne Komets for the duration of the 2013–14 season. In 63 games with the Komets, he matched a career high with 26 points before stepping up his offensive game in the Kelly Cup playoffs to produce 11 points in as many games.

On July 29, 2014, with the Sabres not extending a new contract offer, Szydlowski signed a one-year ECHL contract to remain in Fort Wayne.

In his sixth year with the Komets in the 2017–18 season, Szydlowski increased his offensive output to lead the ECHL in scoring with 79 points in 64 games, earning selection to the First All-Star Team and earning honors as the ECHL's MVP.

After helping the Komets reach the Conference Finals, Szydlowski opted to continue his career abroad, agreeing to a one-year deal with Norwegian outfit, Frisk Asker of the GET-ligaen on June 20, 2018. In the 2018–19 season, Szydlowski featured in 11 games with Asker in scoring 7 points before opting to terminate his contract with the club and return to the United States for personal reasons on November 2, 2018.

Having completed his ninth season with the Fort Wayne Komets, Szydlowski left the club and in need of a new challenge continued in the ECHL by signing with the Orlando Solar Bears for the 2022–23 season on August 4, 2022.

Career statistics

Awards and honors

References

External links

1990 births
Living people
Binghamton Senators players
Cleveland Monsters players
Erie Otters players
Fort Wayne Komets players
Fort Worth Brahmas players
Frisk Asker Ishockey players
Gwinnett Gladiators players
Lake Erie Monsters players
Norfolk Admirals players
Orlando Solar Bears (ECHL) players
Portland Pirates players
Rochester Americans players
People from St. Clair Shores, Michigan
Ice hockey players from Michigan
American men's ice hockey right wingers
Sportspeople from Metro Detroit